Kingsville District High School is a public high school in Kingsville, Ontario, Canada.  The school is the "Home of the Cavaliers".  Enrollment is 656 students. KDHS feeder schools are Harrow Public School, Kingsville Public School and Jack Miner Public School.

History
The school opened in 1921 at its present location after a fire destroyed Essex District High School.  There were three teachers and about 100 students.

In 1953, a new building was erected on the site with additions in 1954, 1963, 1967 and 1972.

In 2016 Harrow District High School closed and merged with Kingsville District High School.

In June 2016, Kingsville District High School students held a Pride flag raising ceremony to recognize June as LGBT Pride Month.  The school was one of the first in the district to raise its pride flag.

Future
In April 2016, the Ministry of Education announced funding for a $44-million JK-to-Grade 12 school to be located in Kingsville.  The new school will consolidate students from Kingsville District High School, Harrow District High School, Kingsville Public School, and Jack Miner Public School, and may be the most expensive school the province has ever built.
In 2021 the project was tendered over budget. In March 2022 the Ministry of Education announced the full $59-million to complete the project. The school is expected to open in 2024.

References

High schools in Essex County, Ontario
1921 establishments in Ontario